Gong Zhichao (born 15 December 1977) is a former badminton player from the People's Republic of China.

Career 
Gong was one of the world's leading women's singles players between her first international titles in 1996 and her retirement in 2002. She won some of the world's biggest tournaments, including the venerable All-England Championship consecutively in 2000 and 2001 over fellow countrywomen Dai Yun and Zhou Mi respectively in the finals. Her other titles included the 1996 Asian Championships, the 2000 Copenhagen Masters; and the Denmark (1996), Swedish (1997), China (1997), Japan (1998, 2000), and Malaysia (2000) Opens. At the then biennial IBF (BWF) World Championships Gong was a silver medalist behind fellow countrywoman Ye Zhaoying in 1997, and a bronze medalist in 2001. She played winning singles for Chinese Uber Cup (women's international) teams that reclaimed the world team title from Indonesia in 1998, and retained the title in 2000.

Unfortunately for Gong, her biggest triumph in an event for individual players, women's singles at the 2000 Olympic Games, is tainted by controversy. According to his later statement, China's head badminton coach Li Yongbo instructed Gong's semifinal opponent, teammate Ye Zhaoying, to "throw" the match against her, on his assumption that Gong would have the better chance to defeat Denmark's Camilla Martin in the final. Whatever the effect of these "instructions" on Ye, a two time former IBF World Champion, she lost the match to Gong 8-11, 8-11, who in turn defeated reigning IBF World Champion Martin for the gold medal 13–10, 11–3.

Achievements

Olympic Games 
Women's singles

World Championships 
Women's singles

World Cup 
Women's singles

Asian Games 
Women's singles

Asian Championships 
Women's singles

IBF World Grand Prix 
The World Badminton Grand Prix sanctioned by International Badminton Federation (IBF) since 1983.

Women's singles

References

External links 
 
 

1977 births
Living people
People from Yiyang
Badminton players from Hunan
Chinese female badminton players
Badminton players at the 2000 Summer Olympics
Olympic badminton players of China
Olympic gold medalists for China
Olympic medalists in badminton
Medalists at the 2000 Summer Olympics
Badminton players at the 1998 Asian Games
Asian Games gold medalists for China
Asian Games silver medalists for China
Asian Games medalists in badminton
Medalists at the 1998 Asian Games
World No. 1 badminton players
21st-century Chinese women
20th-century Chinese women